Johnny Unser (born October 22, 1958) is a former race car driver.  He is the son of open wheel driver Jerry Unser Jr., cousin of Al Unser Jr. and Robby Unser, nephew of Al Unser and Bobby Unser, and first cousin once removed of Alfred Unser. Unser's father, Jerry, died in a racing accident when Unser was seven months old. He made 5 starts in CART in 1993 and 1994 with a best result of 15th. He joined the Indy Racing League in its inaugural 1996 season but had a transmission failure during the pace lap of what would've been his first Indianapolis 500 and was not credited with completing any laps. In 1997 he made his first start in the Indy 500 starting in the 35th position after League and Speedway owner Tony George added his and Lyn St. James' car to the field because slower cars than theirs were guaranteed starting positions because of prior races. He went on to finish 18th, his best "500" result in 5 starts. Unser drove the majority of his IRL races for Hemelgarn Racing and in his 14 career IRL starts he had a best finish of 9th in his very first series start in 1996 at Phoenix International Raceway. His last major open wheel race was the 2000 Indy 500.

On January 14 2008 Johnny Unser was named as the race director for the 2008 Champ Car Atlantic Championship. He is currently a driver coach and adviser to the Mazda Road to Indy and racing adviser and spokesman for Cooper Tire. He is an official for Indycar in Race Control and is also the owner of Unser Racing, Karting and Entertainment track in Denver, Colorado.

Racing record

American Open Wheel
(key)

CART

IndyCar

Indianapolis 500 results

24 Hours of Le Mans results

References

External links
Johnny Unser at ChampCarStats.com

1958 births
American people of Swiss-German descent
24 Hours of Le Mans drivers
24 Hours of Daytona drivers
Champ Car drivers
Indianapolis 500 drivers
IndyCar Series drivers
Living people
Sportspeople from Long Beach, California
Racing drivers from California
Unser family

Dale Coyne Racing drivers